The Journal of Neutron Research is a peer-reviewed scientific journal published by IOS Press. It was established in 1993 and covers research on Neutron scattering and its applications. It publishes original research papers of an experimental and theoretical nature in three areas of specialisation:

 Research Science with Neutrons
 Neutron Instrumentation and Techniques
 Reactor/Spallation Neutron Source Technology
 Neutron Simulation Tools e.g. McStas and VITESS, Data Reduction and Data Analysis
Authors are invited to use LaTeX or Microsoft Word templates and the IOS Press Open Library offers authors an Open Access option.

Abstracting and indexing 
The journal is abstracted and indexed in:

See also
 Scattering theory
 Nuclear physics

References 

 
 </ref>

External links 
 
 IOS Press Privacy Policy
 IOS Press Open Library®
 Neutronsources.org — Information material and news on research using neutron beams
 LENS — League of advanced European Neutron Sources
 ISSE — International Society for Sample Environment
 ISNIE — International Society of Neutron Instrument Engineers

Physics journals
Quarterly journals

Publications established in 1993
English-language journals